Pieper is a surname. Notable people with the surname include:

 Arlene Pieper, first woman to officially finish a marathon in the US - Pikes Peak Marathon in Manitou Springs, Colorado, 1959
 August Pieper (disambiguation), multiple people
 Bradley G. Pieper (born 1942), American businessman and politician
 Cornelia Pieper, German politician of the liberal Free Democratic Party (FDP)
 Franz Pieper, Confessional Lutheran theologian
 Jens Pieper, German archer
 Josef Pieper German Catholic philosopher
 Markus Pieper German politician and Member of the European Parliament for North Rhine-Westphalia
 Michael Pieper (born 1946), Swiss billionaire businessman
 Pat Pieper, Chicago Cubs field (public address) announcer
 Paul C. Pieper (born 1972), American guitarist and composer
 Roel Pieper, Dutch IT-entrepreneur
 Stefan Pieper, German ski jumper